Atlantic Hotel is the name of many hotels around the world:

Germany
Hotel Atlantic Kempinski, Hamburg

Ireland
Atlantic Hotel (Spanish Point, Ireland)

United Kingdom
Atlantic Hotel (Chelmsford)
Atlantic Hotel (Glasgow)
Atlantic Hotel (Jersey)
Atlantic Hotel (Newquay)
Atlantic Hotel (Porthcawl)
Atlantic Hotel (Scilly Isles)
Atlantic Hotel (Tenby)
Grand Atlantic Hotel, Weston-super-Mare

United States

 Atlantic Hotel, Norfolk, Virginia (demolished)
Atlantic Hotel (Missoula, Montana)
Atlantic Hotel, a hotel in St. Louis, Missouri

Gambia
Laico Atlantic Hotel, Banjul